The Entente Cordiale comprised a series of agreements signed on 8 April 1904 between the United Kingdom and the French Republic which saw a significant improvement in Anglo-French relations. Beyond the immediate concerns of  colonial demarcation addressed by the agreement, the signing of the Entente Cordiale marked the end of almost a thousand years of intermittent conflict between the two states and their predecessors, and replaced the modus vivendi that had existed since the end of the Napoleonic Wars in 1815 with a more formal agreement. The Entente Cordiale represented the culmination of the policy of Théophile Delcassé (France's  foreign minister from 1898 to 1905), who believed that a Franco-British understanding would give France some security in Western Europe against any  German system of alliances (see Triple Alliance (1882)). Credit for the success of the negotiation of the Entente Cordiale belongs chiefly to Paul Cambon (France's ambassador in London from 1898 to 1920) and to the British Foreign Secretary, Lord Lansdowne.

An important feature of the agreement was the mutual recognition that Egypt was fully in the British sphere of influence and likewise Morocco in France's, with the proviso that France's eventual dispositions for Morocco include reasonable allowance for Spain's interests there. At the same time, Britain ceded the Los Islands (off French Guinea) to France, defined the frontier of  Nigeria in France's favour, and agreed to French control of the upper Gambia valley; while France renounced its exclusive right to certain fisheries off Newfoundland. Furthermore, French and British proposed zones of influence in Siam (Thailand), which was eventually decided not to be colonised, were outlined, with the eastern territories, adjacent to French Indochina, becoming a proposed French zone, and the western, adjacent to Burmese  Tenasserim, a proposed British zone.  Arrangements were also made to allay the rivalry between British and French colonists in the New Hebrides.

In signing of the Entente Cordiale both powers reduced the virtual isolation into which they had withdrawn—France involuntarily, Britain complacently—while they had eyed each other over African affairs. Britain had no  major-power ally apart from  Japan (1902), which held little sway in European waters; France had none but the  Russian Empire, soon to become militarily discredited in the Russo-Japanese War of 1904–05. The agreement upset the diplomacy of Germany, whose policy had long relied on Franco-British antagonism. A German attempt to check the French in Morocco in 1905 (the Tangier Incident, or First Moroccan Crisis), and thus to upset the Entente, served only to strengthen it. Military discussions between the French and the British general staffs were soon initiated. Franco-British solidarity was confirmed at the Algeciras Conference (1906) and reconfirmed in the  Second Moroccan Crisis (1911).

Background 

The French term Entente Cordiale (usually translated as "cordial agreement" or "cordial understanding") comes from a letter written in 1843 by the British Foreign Secretary Lord Aberdeen to his brother, in which he mentioned "a cordial, good understanding" between the two nations. This was translated into French as Entente Cordiale and used by Louis Philippe I in the French chamber that year. When used today the term almost always denotes the second Entente Cordiale, that is to say, the written and partly secret agreement signed in London between the two powers on 8 April 1904.

The agreement was a change for both countries. France had been isolated from the other European powers, in part because of the destruction of the Napoleonic Wars, threat of liberalism and perceived recklessness in the Franco-Prussian War of 1870–71. German Chancellor Otto von Bismarck also managed to estrange France from potential allies, as it was thought that France might seek revenge for its defeat in the Franco-Prussian War, reverse its territorial losses and continue to press for the conquest of the Saar and territories in the Ruhr. Britain had maintained a policy of "splendid isolation" on the European continent for nearly a century, intervening in continental affairs only when it was considered necessary to protect British interests by limiting the power of other countries, such as Russia in the Balkans, or supporting the creation of Belgium to weaken the Netherlands and create a buffer between France and the German states. The situation for Britain and France changed in the last decade of the 19th century.

The change had its roots in a British loss of confidence after the Second Boer War and a growing fear of the strength of Germany. As early as March 1881, the French statesman Léon Gambetta and the Prince of Wales, Albert Edward, met at the Château de Breteuil to discuss an alliance against Germany. The Scramble for Africa prevented the countries from coming to terms, however. On the initiative of Colonial Secretary Joseph Chamberlain, there were three rounds of British-German talks between 1898 and 1901. The British decided not to join the Triple Alliance, broke off the negotiations with Berlin, and revived the idea of a British-French alliance. 

When the Russo-Japanese War was about to erupt, France and Britain found themselves on the verge of being dragged into the conflict on the side of their respective allies. France was firmly allied with Russia, while the British had recently signed the Anglo-Japanese Alliance. In order to avoid going to war, both powers "shucked off their ancient rivalry" and resolved their differences in Africa, the Americas, Asia, and the Pacific. Toward this end, French foreign minister Théophile Delcassé, and Lord Lansdowne, the British Foreign Secretary, negotiated an agreement on colonial matters, and Lord Lansdowne and Paul Cambon, the French Ambassador to the Court of St James's, signed the resulting convention on 8 April 1904.

Documents signed

The Entente was composed of three documents:
 The first and most important document was the Declaration respecting Egypt and Morocco. In return for the French promising not to "obstruct" British actions in Egypt, the British promised to allow the French to "preserve order ... and provide assistance" in Morocco. Free passage through the Suez Canal was guaranteed, finally putting the Convention of Constantinople into force, and the erection of fortifications on part of the Moroccan coast forbidden. The treaty contained a secret annex dealing with the possibility of "changed circumstances" in the administration of either of the two countries.
 The second document dealt with Newfoundland and portions of West and Central Africa. The French gave up their rights (stemming from the Treaty of Utrecht) over the western coast of Newfoundland, although they retained the right to fish the coast. In return, the British gave the French the town of Yarbutenda (near the modern border between Senegal and the Gambia) and the Iles de Los (part of modern Guinea). An additional provision dealt with the border between French and British possessions east of the River Niger (present-day Niger and Nigeria).
 The final declaration concerned Siam (Thailand), Madagascar, and the New Hebrides (Vanuatu). In Siam, the British recognised a proposed French sphere of influence to the east of the Menam (Chao Phraya) River basin; in turn, the French recognised a proposed British influence over the territory to the west of the Menam basin. Both parties eventually disclaimed any idea of annexing Siamese territory. The British withdrew their objection to the French introducing a tariff in Madagascar. The parties came to an agreement which would "put an end to the difficulties arising from the lack of jurisdiction over the natives of the New Hebrides".

Aftermath 
It is unclear what exactly the Entente meant to the British Foreign Office. For example, in early 1911, following French press reports contrasting the virility of the Triple Alliance with the moribund state of the Entente, Eyre Crowe minuted: "The fundamental fact of course is that the Entente is not an alliance. For purposes of ultimate emergencies it may be found to have no substance at all. For the Entente is nothing more than a frame of mind, a view of general policy which is shared by the governments of two countries, but which may be, or become, so vague as to lose all content."

The Triple Alliance collapsed when Italy remained neutral at the outbreak of World War I, while the Entente endured.

Commemoration
The 100th anniversary of the Entente Cordiale in 2004 was marked by a number of official and unofficial events, including a state visit to France in April by Queen Elizabeth II, and a return visit by President Jacques Chirac in November. British troops (the band of the Royal Marines, the Household Cavalry Mounted Regiment, the Grenadier Guards and the King's Troop, Royal Horse Artillery) also led the Bastille Day parade in Paris for the first time, with the Red Arrows flying overhead.

At both London Waterloo International and Paris Gare du Nord, the flags of Great Britain and of France were depicted, connected with the words 'Entente cordiale' superimposed on posters. Some French political leaders had complained about the name "Waterloo" for the destination of trains from Paris, because the London terminus is named after the 1815 battle in which a British-led alliance defeated Napoleon's army, and in 1998 French politician Florent Longuepée wrote to British Prime Minister Tony Blair demanding, without success, that the name be changed. However, in November 2007 St Pancras International became the new London terminus for the Eurostar service.

Entente Cordiale Scholarships
The name "Entente Cordiale" is used for the Entente Cordiale Scholarships scheme, a selective Franco-British scholarship scheme which was announced on 30 October 1995 by British Prime Minister John Major and French President Jacques Chirac at an Anglo-French summit in London. 
It provides funding for British and French students to study for one academic year on the other side of the Channel. The scheme is administered by the French embassy in London for British students, and by the British Council in France and the British embassy in Paris for French students. Funding is provided by the private sector and foundations. The scheme aims to foster mutual understanding and to promote exchanges between the British and French leaders of tomorrow. The programme was initiated by Sir Christopher Mallaby, British ambassador to France between 1993 and 1996.

See also 
 Anglo-French Supreme War Council
France–United Kingdom relations
 Auld Alliance
 British military history
 Causes of World War I
 Diplomatic history of World War I
 Diplomatic history of World War II
 Entente (disambiguation)
 Entente frugale
 Foreign relations of France
 Franco-British Council
 Franco-British Union
 French entry into World War I
 History of the foreign relations of the United Kingdom
 International relations of the Great Powers (1814–1919)

References

Further reading
 Andrew, Christopher. Théophile Delcassé and the making of the Entente Cordiale: A reappraisal of French Foreign Policy 1898–1905 (1968)
 Andrew, Christopher. "France and the Making of the Entente Cordiale." Historical Journal 10#1 (1967): 89-105. online.
 Bell, P. M. H. France and Britain, 1900-1940: Entente and Estrangement (1996).
 Capet, Antoine, ed. Britain, France and the entente cordiale since 1904 (Springer, 2006).
 Hargreaves, J. D. "The Origin of the Anglo-French Military Conversations in 1905." History 36.128 (1951): 244-248. online
 Hargreaves, J. D. "Entente Manquee: Anglo-French Relations, 1895-1896." Cambridge Historical Journal 11#1 (1953): 65-92. online.
 Hennlichová, Marcela. "The Royal Visit to Paris and the Presidential Visit to London in 1903 — An Icebreaker of the Public Opinion or a Milestone in the History of the Entente Cordiale?" "Prague Papers on the History of International Relations" 1 (2019): 38-53. online
 Keiger, J.F.V. France and the World since 1870 (2001) pp 115–17, 164–68
 Langer, William L. The Diplomacy of Imperialism,  1890–1902 (1951).
 Macmillan, Margaret. The War That Ended Peace: The Road to 1914 (2013) ch 6
 Rolo, P. J. V. Entente Cordiale: the origins and negotiation of the Anglo-French agreements of 8 April 1904. Macmillan/St Martin's Press, London 1969.
 Šubrtová, Marcela. "Great Britain and France on the Way to the Entente Cordiale." Prague Papers on the History of International Relations 1 (2014): 79–97. online
 Šubrtová, Marcela. "The Anglo-French Rapprochement and the Question of Morocco." West Bohemian Historical Review 2 (2016): 213-241 online
 Taylor, A.J.P. The Struggle for Mastery in Europe, 1848–1918 (1954) online free
 Williamson, Samuel R. The politics of grand strategy: Britain and France prepare for war, 1904-1914 (1990).

External links 

Entente cordiale
First declaration of the Entente cordiale including secret articles
A statistical commemoration of the Entente Cordiale published jointly by the British and French Ministries of Defence (British MOD text, bilingual)
A statistical commemoration of the Entente Cordiale published jointly by the British and French Ministries of Defence (French MOD text, bilingual)

1904 in France
1904 in the United Kingdom
20th-century military alliances
British Empire in World War I
France in World War I
France–United Kingdom relations
Late modern Europe
Treaties concluded in 1904
Treaties entered into force in 1904
Treaties of the United Kingdom (1801–1922)
Treaties of the French Third Republic
1904 in international relations